The Counter Terrorism Response Unit (CTRU; Simplified Chinese: 反恐特勤队; Traditional Chinese: 反恐特勤隊) is a paramilitary police tactical unit of the Hong Kong Police Force tasked with countering terrorist attacks, counter-terrorism patrol, escorting VIPs, hostage rescue and tackling bio-attacks and bomb threats. The CTRU is the second police tactical unit that is capable of operating amphibious warfare next to the SDU.

It's also the first full-time counter-terrorism police unit in Asia.

History

In June 2022, the HKPF publicly unveiled new uniforms for the CTRU alongside the ASU and the RRT.

In November 2022, the HKPF merged the RRT into the CTRU.

Duties 
The CTRU executes tasks by the counter-terrorism strategies, which is 'Defense, protection, guard, investigation and restoration', of the Police Force and assists the SDU if necessary. The jurisdiction of the CTRU covers the whole of HKSAR, except for the Hong Kong International Airport which is under the protection of Airport Security Unit. The CTRU is responsible for the security of government buildings, LOCPG, Diplomatic missions, infrastructures, ports, railways, gathering places (including HKCEC) and any structures with potential terrorist threats.

Facing increasing terrorist threat, the CTRU also tackles with explosives, bio weapons and nuclear weapons.

Organization 

 CTRU Headquarters: receiving direct orders from the Counter-terrorism Department.
 Operation: At the beginning of CTRU's establishment, the number of the force is projected to reach 141 (reached in 2012)
 Action Squad (Cougar)
 Action Squad (Trooper)
 Action Squad (Ranger)
 Action Squad (Unicorn): The original action squad.
 Training and development

Weapons and equipment

Weapons

Pistol 
 Glock 17 Gen 3 with pistol light
 Glock 19

Assault Rifle 
 SIG Sauer 516

Submachine Gun 
 HK MP5A5
 SIG MPX (Inherited from the now merged Railway Response Team)

Vehicle 
Mercedes-Benz Sprinter 518CDI
Toyota HiAce
Toyota Land Cruiser

Communication equipment 
 MotorolaMTP850Ex
 Survival lamps
 NV goggles
 Thermal scopes

Rescue equipment 
 Tactical Axe
 Ladder

Medic 
 First aid
 Powerheart AED G3
 Pulse oximeter

Personal equipment 
 Helmet
 Combat helmet
 Team Wendy Exfil LTP
 Team Wendy Exfil LTP Ballistic 
 Future Assault Shell Technology helmet
 Bolle x800, Revision, Pyramex I-Force Slim
 Noise-cancelling headphones
 Gas mask
 Avon S10
 Avon fm54
 Tactical vest
 KSTU Laser Cut Plate Carrier
 Danner 15404, LOWA
 Ballistic shield
 Axe

References 

Hong Kong Police Force
Non-military counterterrorist organizations
Special forces of Hong Kong
2009 establishments in Hong Kong